Volkensinia is a monotypic genus of flowering plants belonging to the family Amaranthaceae. It only contains one known species; Volkensinia prostrata. It is in the subfamily Amaranthoideae.

Its native range is north eastern and eastern Tropical Africa, it is found in Ethiopia, Kenya, Sudan and Tanzania.

The genus name of Volkensinia is in honour of Georg Volkens (1855–1917), a German botanist born in Berlin. The Latin specific epithet of prostrata means on the ground as derived from prostrate.
Both the genus and the sole species were first described and published in Vierteljahrsschr. Naturf. Ges. Zürich Vol.57 on page 535 in 1912.

References

Amaranthaceae
Amaranthaceae genera
Plants described in 1912
Flora of Ethiopia
Flora of Kenya
Flora of Sudan
Flora of Tanzania
Monotypic Caryophyllales genera